Unquestionable Presence: Live At Wacken is a two disc live album by the technical death metal band Atheist. Disc one features the band's reunion performance at Wacken Open Air in 2006 and disc two features a compilation of Atheist tracks from previous albums.

Track listing
Disc one
 "Unquestionable Presence" – 4:53
 "On They Slay" – 4:01
 "Unholy War" – 2:28
 "Your Life's Retribution" – 3:17
 "An Incarnation's Dream" – 3:54
 "Mother Man" – 5:59
 "And The Psychic Saw" – 5:29
 "Piece Of Time" – 5:58
Disc two
 "Piece Of Time" - 4:33
 "I Deny" - 4:00
 "Unholy War" - 2:18
 "Room With A View" - 4:05
 "Mother Man" - 4:33
 "Unquestionable Presence" - 4:07
 "And The Psychic Saw" - 4:49
 "An Incarnation's Dream" - 4:52
 "Mineral" - 4:33
 "Water" - 4:28
 "Air" - 5:34

Personnel
Kelly Schaefer – vocals
Sonny Carson – lead guitar
Chris Baker – rhythm guitar
Tony Choy – bass
Steve Flynn – drums

Production
Matt Washburn – mixing

References

2009 live albums
Atheist (band) albums
Relapse Records live albums